San Juan Hill can refer to:

 San Juan Hill, Manhattan, an African American community in the New York City area now known as Lincoln Square, Manhattan
San Juan Hill, a landform in Santiago de Cuba, Cuba
The Battle of San Juan Hill, a battle of the Spanish–American War